These are the Billboard Hot R&B/Hip-Hop Songs chart number-one singles of 2012.

Chart history

See also
2012 in music
List of Billboard Hot Rap Songs number-one hits of the 2010s

References 

2012
United States RandB Singles
2012 in American music